The men's 800 metres event at the 1998 Commonwealth Games was held 17–19 September on National Stadium, Bukit Jalil.

Medalists

Results

Heats
Qualification: First 2 of each heat (Q) and the next 6 fastest (q) qualified for the semifinals.

Semifinals
Qualification: First 4 of each heat qualified directly (Q) for the final.

Final

References

800
1998